Luo Xiaoling (born 20 September 1988) is a Chinese professional racing cyclist. She rides for China Chongming-Liv-Champion System Pro Cycling. She is from Gansu. She also competed at the 2014 Asian Games.

Major results

2012
 10th Road race, Asian Road Championships
2014
 1st  Omnium, Asian Track Championships
 1st Omnium, Hong Kong International Track Cup
 1st Omnium, China Track Cup
 2nd  Omnium, Asian Games
2015
 1st  Omnium, Asian Track Championships
 2nd Omnium, South Australian Grand Prix
 2nd Omnium, Super Drome Cup
 9th Overall The Princess Maha Chackri Sirindhon's Cup
2016
 1st  Omnium, Asian Track Championships
2017
 Asian Track Championships
1st  Team pursuit (with Chen Qiaolin, Chen Siyu and Huang Dongyan)
2nd  Omnium

See also
 List of 2015 UCI Women's Teams and riders

References

External links
 

1988 births
Living people
Chinese female cyclists
Cyclists from Gansu
Asian Games medalists in cycling
Cyclists at the 2014 Asian Games
Olympic cyclists of China
Cyclists at the 2016 Summer Olympics
Asian Games silver medalists for China
Medalists at the 2014 Asian Games
21st-century Chinese women